Water polo events were contested at the 1963 Summer Universiade in Porto Alegre, Brazil.

References
 Universiade water polo medalists on HickokSports

1963 Summer Universiade
Universiade
1963
1963